Ferson is a surname. Notable people with the surname include:

Alex Ferson (1866–1957), American baseball player
Ginny Ferson (born 1963), British diplomat
Scott Ferson, American political consultant
Scott Ferson (professor), American academic

See also
Dimon McFerson, American chief executive